The First Federal Basketball League was the highest tier level men's professional club basketball competition in SFR Yugoslavia. Founded in 1945 and folded in 1992 (1991-92 Winer Broker YUBA League), it was run by the Basketball Federation of Yugoslavia. With a total of 16 European-wide trophy winners and 11 finalists, the Yugoslav First Basketball League was one of the strongest European national domestic basketball leagues of all time.

Although each of the former Yugoslav countries have their own national domestic leagues, the six nations also now take part in the ABA League (commonly known as the Adriatic League), which was founded in 2001; and which is, the closest basketball league in existence today, that is similar to the former Yugoslav Basketball League.

History
After the end of Second World War in Yugoslavia in 1945, there arose a need for athletic development in the fledgling nation. Post-WW2 Yugoslavia was (with the exception of major cities such as Belgrade, Ljubljana, Zagreb, and Sarajevo) for the most part lacking in competitive opportunities in sports. In response to this, 1945 and 1946 saw an explosion of new clubs and leagues for every sport, the basketball league being part of this phenomenon.

The very first competition under the newly formed Yugoslav Basketball League in 1945, drawing parallel to the Yugoslav First League (of football), was more or less a nationwide affirmation of unity. Instead of individual clubs competing in the usual fashion, there were only eight teams. Six representing each state within Yugoslavia, one representing the province of Vojvodina, and the last representing the Yugoslav People's Army.

Only in the 1970s did the basketball culture of Yugoslavia truly come to enjoy recognition as the top nation in basketball. Breaking away from the dominance of the Soviet Union, the Yugoslav league gave rise to stars that would go on to win multiple Basketball World Championships and European Basketball Championships. After a decade of dominance, the 1980s saw a disappointing slump of talent in the Yugoslav Basketball League.

Once again the world witnessed a sleeping giant come awake in the early 90s as Yugoslavia won two straight European Basketball Championships and a World Basketball Championship. This momentum was swiftly halted by the ethnic strife which broke out in 1991. Clubs from SR Slovenia and SR Croatia withdrew from the league so that the 1991–92 season, the competition's last, was contested without them. The country got divided into five successor republics, each founding their own basketball federations with the exception of Serbia and Montenegro, which retained the name Federal Republic of Yugoslavia and the YUBA League.

Despite all these changes, the joint league of clubs from the former Yugoslavia proved to be a winning league format formula, so on July 3, 2001, the Adriatic League was founded. It features teams from all the former Yugoslav states, and it exists alongside scaled-down versions of the individual national domestic leagues of each of the former Yugoslav states.

Title holders 

 1945: Yugoslav Army
 1946: Crvena zvezda
 1947: Crvena zvezda 
 1948: Crvena zvezda 
 1949: Crvena zvezda
 1950: Crvena zvezda 
 1951: Crvena zvezda 
 1952: Crvena zvezda 
 1953: Crvena zvezda
 1954: Crvena zvezda 
 1955: Crvena zvezda 
 1956: Proleter Zrenjanin
 1957: AŠK Olimpija
 1958: OKK Beograd
 1959: AŠK Olimpija
 1960: OKK Beograd 
 ......1961: AŠK Olimpija
 ......1962: AŠK Olimpija
 ......1963: OKK Beograd 
 ......1964: OKK Beograd 
 ......1965: Zadar
 ......1966: AŠK Olimpija
 ......1967: Zadar 
 1967–68: Zadar 
 1968–69: Crvena zvezda 
 1969–70: AŠK Olimpija
 1970–71: Jugoplastika
 1971–72: Crvena zvezda 
 1972–73: Radnički Belgrade
 1973–74: Zadar 
 1974–75: Zadar 
 1975–76: Partizan
 1976–77: Jugoplastika
 1977–78: Bosna 
 1978–79: Partizan 
 1979–80: Bosna 
 1980–81: Partizan 
 1981–82: Cibona
 1982–83: Bosna 
 1983–84: Cibona 
 1984–85: Cibona 
 1985–86: Zadar 
 1986–87: Partizan 
 1987–88: Jugoplastika
 1988–89: Jugoplastika 
 1989–90: Jugoplastika 
 1990–91: POP 84 
 1991–92: Partizan

Performance by club

Performance by constitutional republics

Playoff finals
Playoffs, as a way of determining the Yugoslav First Basketball League champion following the regular season, got instituted in 1981 ahead of the 1981–82 season.

Source: official website archive

Clubs in European and worldwide competitions

Notable players

Statistical leaders

Successor leagues 
  YUBA League (1992–2006)
  HT Premijer liga (1991–present)
  Premier A League (1991–present)
  Basketball Championship (1993–present)
  First League (1992–present)
  Basketball League (2006–present)
  Basketball League (2006–present)
 Adriatic League (2001–present)

See also
 Yugoslav 1. B Federal Basketball League
 Yugoslav Basketball Cup

Notes

References

 
Defunct basketball leagues in Europe
Bas
1945 establishments in Yugoslavia
Sports leagues established in 1945
1992 disestablishments in Yugoslavia
Sports leagues disestablished in 1992
Basketball men